Shigeki Noguchi (野口 茂樹; born May 13, 1974) is a Japanese former professional baseball pitcher in Nippon Professional Baseball. He played for the Chunichi Dragons from 1994 to 2005 and the Yomiuri Giants from 2006 to 2007. He was the Central League MVP in 1999 after going 19-7 with a 2.65 earned run average.

Noguchi also played Minor League Baseball in 1994 in the Colorado Rockies organization. In 2009, he signed a minor league deal with the Toronto Blue Jays but was released after failing a physical.

References

External links

1974 births
Central Valley Rockies players
Chunichi Dragons players
Japanese expatriate baseball players in the United States
Living people
Nippon Professional Baseball MVP Award winners
Nippon Professional Baseball pitchers
Baseball people from Ehime Prefecture
Yomiuri Giants players